Nizami Rayon (Низами Рајону, نیظامی رایوننو) is a municipal district of the city of Baku, the capital of Azerbaijan. Its population is 201,239 and it includes the municipality of Keşlə. Of these, 25,626 lives in Keşlə municipality. The raion's area is 19.6 km².

Name
The district is named after poet Nizami Ganjavi. There is an urban type settlement called 8th kilometer at Nizami raion. The stadium "Bakcell Arena" is situated at 8th kilometer district of Nizami raion.

References 

Districts of Baku